Mark Heslin is an Irish lawyer who has been a Judge of the High Court since December 2019. He was formerly a litigation solicitor at a commercial law firm.

Early life 
Heslin was born in Ardnacassa, County Longford to Noel and Máiréad Heslin. He received his primary school education from Ballinalee National School and Melview National School, and attended secondary school at St. Mel's College and Rockwell College. He studied law at University College Galway and served a term as the auditor of the Literary and Debating Society. He subsequently studied at the Law Society of Ireland and was admitted to the Role of Solicitors in 1995.

Legal career 
He started his career at Beauchamps Solicitors in Dublin. He was a senior partner in the firm in litigation, with particular expertise on commercial disputes in the Irish courts. He advised on a wide range of law and his clients included Allied Irish Banks and the National Asset Management Agency.

During his time as a solicitor, he was a contributor to academic journals and tutored classes at the Law Society.

In 2012, he argued against the televising of court cases in Ireland.

Judicial career 
Heslin was appointed to the High Court in December 2019. He is the first High Court judge to come from Longford.

He has presided over cases involving judicial review, injunction applications, insolvency law, and commercial disputes. In January 2020, he overturned a decision of An Bord Pleanála which had refused permission for the development of a Narconon facility in County Meath.

References 

Living people
Alumni of the University of Galway
High Court judges (Ireland)
21st-century Irish judges
People from County Longford
Irish solicitors
People educated at Rockwell College
Year of birth missing (living people)